National Parks of Azerbaijan are run by the Ministry of Ecology and Natural Resources in the Republic of Azerbaijan. The first national park established was Zangezur National Park in 2003. Since then a further 9 national parks have been established; the most recent being the Gizilaghaj National Park in 2018.

The national parks are the public lands or bodies of water of special environmental, historical and other importance, which bear the status of governmental protection. They serve to the purposes of environmental protection, educational, scientific, cultural researches, etc.

National Parks

As a country located in the Caucasus between the Black and Caspian Seas, Azerbaijan has a rich flora and fauna and widest biodiversity among the European states and enormous natural resources. The lands with specially protected ecosystems play the crucial roles in biodiversity preservation. The activity of such natural bodies promotes the preservation of rare and endangered species of plants and animals. Azerbaijan has a total of 9 national parks (as well as 13 state natural parks and 21 state reserves), which are listed in the table with the year of their establishment and their surface area.

In total more than 4,9% of Azerbaijan is under protection by the government as national parks.

Zangezur National Park

The Zangezur National Park (it was renamed and expanded in 2009 from former Ordubad National Park) is characterized by rich biological diversity. It has 58 species of animals (35 of vertebrates and 23 of insects) and 39 species of plants which are included into the Red Book of Azerbaijan. The National Park comprises such rare and endangered species as Persian leopard, the mountain sheep-moufflon, bezoar goat, white-tail sea eagle, golden eagle, little bustard.

Shirvan National Park

The Shirvan National Park has a semi-desert landscape and water body of approximately 40 square kilometres. The national park has an extremely rich ornithological fauna. Rare and valuable species of birds (turaj, little bustard, bustard, swans, flamingo, etc.) winter and nest in the marshy areas. Djeyran gazelles are the most widely spread mammals in the region.

Ag-Gol National Park

Ag-Gol National Park is located in the Mil plain of the Kur-Araz lowlands, it has semi-desert landscape and deserved the title of a bird paradise, as the most important winter and nest place of birds. 
The ornithological fauna of this reserve is very rich. Over 140 species of birds are found in this place including 89 species of nesting birds (Partridge, spoonbill, swan, teal, bustard, etc.). Ag-Gol national park is designed to protect the marshy ecological systems, as the nesting and wintering places of migratory and water birds. Ag-Gol has been incorporated into the list of UNESCO's convention "On internationally important marshy areas as the residing places of birds"

Hirkan National Park

Hirkan National Park is located in the Lenkoran Lowland and the Talysh Mountains, and is 99% covered by forests in a primarily mountainous region, and is strictly protected.

Hirkan National Park preserves relict and endemic plants species of Tertiary period. Forests of Hirkan account for 150 out of 435 types of trees and bushes. One can come across such types of trees, included into the Red Book of Azerbaijan as, Hirkan box tree, iron tree, chestnut leave oak, fig-tree, Hirkan pear-tree, Silk Acacia, Caucasus palm-tree, Caspian gleditsia, butcher's broom, alder-tree, such animals as the Persian leopard, the Talysh pheasant, golden eagle, etc.

Altyaghach National Park

The area of Altyaghach is 90.5% covered by temperate deciduous broadleaved forests. The major types of trees are iron trees, Caucasus hornbeam, Oriental beech, cud, birch-tree, etc. The national park is home to the rare East Caucasian tur (Capra cylindricornis), a mountain dwelling goat antelope found only in the eastern half of the Caucasus Mountains. Animals as the roe deer, bear, wild boar, lynx, fox, rabbit, squirrel, wolf, etc. are found on the territory of this park.

Absheron National Park

The predecessor of Absheron National Park during Soviet times was the Absheron State Nature Preserve which was created in July 1969 in order to protect gazelle, Caspian seal and water birds inhabited in the territory. The climate of the area is mild-hot, specific to semi-desert and dry steppe. Types and phytomass of flora is too poor here, plants are changed respective of water and saltiness regime of area. Sea coastal sand plants (42,6%), meadows with jigilgamish and paz grass (13,2%), one-year saline grasses (5,2%) etc. are spread. Ephemeras also develop well in early spring. In dry area gazelle, jackal, fox, rabbit, badger, in Caspian waters seal and various fishes, birds such as silver gull, wheezing swan, grey and red-headed black, white-eyed black ducks, big white bittern, sandpiper, bald-coot, marsh belibagli, sea bozcha and other migrant birds have inhabited here.
Animals and birds inhabiting in Shirvan National Park, names of which have been included in the Red Books, exist in Absheron National Park as well.

Shahdag National Park

The Shakhdag National Park was created in 2006, and became the largest national park not only Azerbaijan but in the whole Caucasus.

The Shahdag National Park is located in northern Azerbaijan, on the border with Russia and Georgia at the Greater Caucasus Mountains. The World Bank has allocated a $17 million loan and $8 million grant for the national park's creation, while the government of Japan has provided $8 million as a grant for the project implementation. Shahdag National Park will help address ecological issues and build a tourist infrastructure in the Caucasus for visitors .

Göygöl National Park

The Göygöl National Park was created in 2008. The predecessor of Göygöl National Park during Soviet times was the "Goy Gol State Reserve" that was established in 1925. The Göygöl National Park is located in eastern Azerbaijan, on the northern slopes of the Lesser Caucasus and includes Lake Göygöl after which it is named. The area of Göygöl is almost entirely covered by forests and has a rich flora with over 420 plant species, including 20 which are endemic to the area. It also has a rich fauna, with mammals such as brown bears, Caucasian red deer, roe deer, lynx, etc. and birds such as the lammergeyer, raven, mountain partridge.

Samur-Yalama National Park

The Samur-Yalama National Park was created in 2012. The major part of the national park is in the Caspian coastal zone and is covered with forests. The types of habitats include the littoral zone, forest, bush and steppe. Some characteristic species are black kite, eastern imperial eagle, otter, reed cat, lynx, chamois, Caspian red deer and brown bear. In the coastal waters belonging to the national park, stellate sturgeon, brown trout, eel, pikeperch and Caspian kutum can be found.

Gizilaghaj National Park

The Gizilaghaj National Park was created in 2018 and is currently the newest national park of Azerbaijan.

Geographic location

See also
 Nature of Azerbaijan
 State Reserves of Azerbaijan
 List of protected areas of Azerbaijan
 Ministry of Ecology and Natural Resources

External links
 National Parks - Ministry of Ecology and Natural Resources of Azerbaijan 

 
Lists of national parks
National parks
National parks